Down to Earth is a 1947 musical comedy film starring Rita Hayworth, Larry Parks, and Marc Platt, and directed by Alexander Hall. The film is a sequel to the 1941 film Here Comes Mr. Jordan, also directed by Hall. While Edward Everett Horton and James Gleason reprised their roles from the earlier film, Roland Culver replaced Claude Rains as Mr. Jordan.

Plot
Terpsichore, one of the Nine Muses of Olympus, is annoyed that popular Broadway producer Danny Miller is putting on a play which portrays the Muses as man-crazy tarts fighting for the attention of a pair of Air Force pilots who crashed on Mount Parnassus. She asks permission from Mr. Jordan to go to Earth and fix the play. Jordan agrees and sends Messenger 7013 to keep an eye on her. Terpsichore uses the name Kitty Pendleton and quickly gets an agent, Max Corkle, and a part in the show. As the play is being rehearsed, Kitty convinces Danny that his depictions of the Muses is wrong. Danny, who has fallen madly in love with Kitty, soon agrees with her point of view and alters the play from a musical farce to a high-minded ballet in the style of Martha Graham, scored by Mario Castelnuovo-Tedesco.

The revised play debuts on the road and is a complete flop. Danny, who is in debt to gangsters who will kill him unless the show is a success, is forced to go back to his original concept. He and Kitty quarrel over this, and Kitty plans to leave when Jordan shows up and explains the situation. Despite her argument with Danny, Kitty still loves him and decides to save him at the expense of her and her sisters' reputation. Overhearing the exchange, Corkle realizes that Jordan is the same heavenly messenger he had heard about some time ago when his friend Joe Pendleton had died and switched bodies. Corkle reveals that Joe, now living his life as K.O. Murdock, is happily married with two children.

Kitty returns to the musical and performs "Swingin' the Muses" in Danny's original vision. When the musical becomes a hit, Kitty learns her time on Earth is up and she must return to Heaven, despite her pleas to stay with Danny. She manages to convince Corkle to tell the police about the gangsters before finding herself becoming invisible to mortals. Though he cannot see her, Danny discovers her coat that she left behind and becomes devastated at her sudden departure. He recasts the Terpsichore role to chorus girl Georgia Evans, who hires Corkle as her new agent. In Heaven, Jordan assures Kitty that she will see Danny again and grants her a vision of their eventual reunion in the afterlife.

Cast
 Rita Hayworth as Terpsichore/Kitty Pendleton (singing voice dubbed by Anita Ellis)
 Roland Culver as Mr. Jordan
 Larry Parks as Danny Miller (singing voice dubbed by Hal Derwin)
 James Gleason as Max Corkle
 Edward Everett Horton as Messenger 7013
 Adele Jergens as Georgia Evans/New Terpsichore (singing voice dubbed by Kay Starr)
 William Haade as Spike 
 James Burke as Detective Kelly
 Marc Platt as Eddie
 Kathleen O'Malley as Dolly
Arthur Blake as Nathaniel Somerset
 Frank Darien as Janitor (uncredited) 
 Ethan Laidlaw as Stagehand (uncredited)

Remakes
The title "Down to Earth" was used for the comedy film Down to Earth (2001) starring Chris Rock, which is a remake of Here Comes Mr. Jordan.

Down to Earth is cited as an inspiration for the film Xanadu (1980) starring Olivia Newton-John, Michael Beck and Gene Kelly. The film ended up performing poorly at the box office but has since become a cult classic.

See also
 List of films about angels
 Muses in popular culture

References

External links
 
 

1947 films
1947 musical comedy films
1947 romantic comedy films
1940s romantic musical films
1940s fantasy films
American fantasy comedy films
American musical comedy films
American musical fantasy films
American romantic comedy films
American romantic fantasy films
American romantic musical films
Columbia Pictures films
Films directed by Alexander Hall
Films scored by Heinz Roemheld
Films scored by Mario Castelnuovo-Tedesco
Greek and Roman deities in fiction
1940s English-language films
1940s American films